Metropolitan Parkway, formerly known as Stewart Avenue, is a major thoroughfare through southwestern Atlanta, Georgia. It is signed throughout as US 19/US 41/SR 3.

Route description

Once Metropolitan Parkway reaches Whitehall Street (the southern portion of Peachtree Street), the parkway turns into Northside Drive northward to Marietta.

Once it reaches Hapeville, it is called Dogwood Street, and it ends at Central Avenue. US 19/US 41/SR 3 continues east down Central Avenue.

Landmarks along the street include Atlanta Metropolitan College, the Stewart-Lakewood shopping center, and the Capitol View Baptist Church.

History
Metropolitan Parkway was once known as "Stewart Avenue", after one of the street's first inhabitants Andrew P. Stewart. The name was changed in 1997 because of the area's red-light district reputation, especially for prostitution activity in motels. Despite the name change, prostitution remains a problem in the area.

Gallery

See also
 
 
 Transportation in Atlanta
 List of former Atlanta street names

References

Roads in Atlanta
Parkways in the United States
U.S. Route 19
U.S. Route 41